Ostdeutsche Eisenbahn GmbH (ODEG; literally "East German Railway") is a joint venture, founded in June 2002, of the Prignitzer Eisenbahn (part of the Netinera Group) and BeNEX, with each company owning 50% of the joint venture. It operates passenger services on eleven railway lines in Berlin/Brandenburg, Mecklenburg-Vorpommern, Saxony and Saxony-Anhalt.

Rolling stock

 

14x Stadler Regio-Shuttle RS1
6x Siemens Desiro Classic
6x Stadler GTW
16x Stadler KISS
1x Stadler Flirt
7x Siemens Desiro ML

Network

Current services

Former services

Network map

References

External links
 

Railway companies of Germany
Private railway companies of Germany
Railway companies established in 2002
Companies based in Mecklenburg-Western Pomerania
Transport in Berlin
Transport in Brandenburg
Transport in Mecklenburg-Western Pomerania
Transport in Saxony
Transport in Saxony-Anhalt